Hòa Sơn may refer to several rural communes in Vietnam, including:

Hòa Sơn, Đà Nẵng, a commune of Hòa Vang District
Hòa Sơn, Bắc Giang, a commune of Hiệp Hòa District
Hòa Sơn, Đắk Lắk, a commune of Krông Bông District
Hòa Sơn, Hòa Bình, a commune of Lương Sơn District
Hòa Sơn, Lạng Sơn, a commune of Hữu Lũng District
Hòa Sơn, Nghệ An, a commune of Đô Lương District
Hòa Sơn, Ninh Thuận, a commune of Ninh Sơn District